Grimborg is the third studio album by the Finnish folk/world music group Gjallarhorn, released in 2003.

Track listing
 "Konungadöttrarna" (The King's daughters) – 4:55
 "Grimborg" – 4:03
 "Tora Lille" (Little Tora) – 4:01
 "Polonaise" – 3:44
 "Menuett" – 2:10
 "Njawara" – 2:43
 "Herr Olof" (Sir Olof) – 5:39
 "Ella Lilla" (Dear Ella) – 5:14
 "Ack Lova Gud" (Oh, Praise the Lord) – 4:28
 "Frøysnesen / Soteroen" – 4:36
 "Vallevan" – 4:31
 "Kulning" (Cow calling) – 5:30
 "Längtaren" – 2:59

Critical reception 
The Allmusic review by Chris Nickson awards the album 4.5 stars and states "There's nothing like the pleasure one can get from hearing a band take a quantum leap in its development, and with the very purplish Grimborg (just look at the cover), Gjallarhorn has made theirs."

Personnel
Jenny Wilhelms – vocals, violin, Hardanger fiddle
Adrian Jones – viola, mandola
Tommy Mansikka-Aho – didgeridoo, slideridoo, Jews harp, udu, djembe, berimbau, shaman drum
Sara Puljula – bass, percussion

References 

2003 albums
Gjallarhorn albums